Donga Garu Swagatham is a 1987 Indian Telugu-language action comedy film written and directed by G. Ram Mohana Rao starring Krishna and Vijayashanti in the lead roles. It has musical score by Chakravarthi. Y. Satyanarayana produced the film for Subhodaya Art Productions.

The film was released on 31 December 1987 to positive response from viewers turning out to be a Superhit at the box office. Donga Garu Swagatham is actor Krishna's 253rd film.

Cast 
 Krishna as Rambabu
 Vijayashanti
 Jaggayya
 Gollapudi Maruthi Rao
 Giribabu
 Sudhakar
 Suttivelu
 Y. Vijaya
 Annapurna

Music 

Chakravarthi scored and composed the film's soundtrack. Veturi Sundararama Murthy penned the lyrics.
 Dollu Puchchakayalaga — S. Janaki, Raj Sitaram
 Dooram Dooram — S. Janaki, Raj Sitaram
 Uyyala Uyyala — S. Janaki, Raj Sitaram
 Ok Chesuko — S. Janaki, Raj Sitaram
 Naa Guttune — S. Janaki

References

External links 
 Donga Garu Swagatham on Twitter
 

1980s Telugu-language films
1987 films
Indian action comedy-drama films
1980s masala films
Films scored by K. Chakravarthy